"25/8" is a song by American R&B recording artist Mary J. Blige. It was written by Blige, Crystal Johnson, Al Sherrod Lambert, and Eric Hudson for her tenth studio album, My Life II... The Journey Continues (Act 1) (2011), while production was handled by Blige and the latter. An R&B and soul song, "25/8" is built on drum splashes and a fluttering flute, and samples from B. T. Express's rendition of "Now That We Found Love", written by Kenneth Gamble and Leon Huff. Lyrically, it features the female protagonist expressing her need to have more than 24 hours a day, 7 days a week to spend time with her love interest.

"25/8" was generally well received by music critics, who noted it as one of the highlights from My Life II and complimented both Hudson's production and Blige's vocal performance. Selected as the album's first official single, following the release of promotional buzz track "Someone to Love Me (Naked)," it was released digitally on September 1, 2011. Commercially, "25/8" became Blige's first lead single to miss the US Billboard Hot 100, though it peaked at number 35 on the Hot R&B/Hip-Hop Songs chart and entered the top ten on Billboards Adult R&B Songs chart. The song's accompanying music video was directed by Diane Martel.

Background
"25/8" written by Blige, Crystal Johnson, Al Sherrod Lambert, and Eric Hudson, while production was helmed by Blige and Hudson. Conceptualized by Johnson, it was created around its title when she experienced a long wait. She later elaborated: "I think I was leaving some hibachi spot and I think they had a long wait and I was like “ain’t enough hours in a day for this. I’m hungry, I need to eat now.” I kept saying 24/7, 24/7 and I was like what about, what comes after seven, oh yea eight. I literally think like that. So I’m like “25/8”... that sounds like a song. It’s a dope title but what does it mean."

Release and promotion
"25/8" was released to iTunes and Amazon as a digital download on September 1, 2011. Blige performed the song for the first time live on Good Morning America September 2, 2011. Blige also performed "25/8" on Dancing with the Stars October 4, 2011.

Critical reception
While critical reaction toward its parent album My Life II... The Journey Continues (Act 1) was generally mixed, "25/8" was lauded by contemporary music critics. Kanya King, writing for CNN International, felt that "25/8" was "a track that meets all of the criteria of what Mary J. Blige is all about: It's soul meets hip hop with her rough vocals complementing the track. A true great among us and like a fine wine, only gets better with age." Allmusic editor Andy Kellman wrote that "chest-beating pleader “25/8” clearly aims for classic status with a Gamble/Huff sample." In his review for PopMatters, David Masciotra commented that the "feisty orchestral swing of "25/8" is a particular highlight," commending the "great looseness to Blige’s voice, a voice that has always sounded incredibly natural and pure and, in fact, she has never sounded better than on this record."

PopCrush writer Trent Fitzgerald called "25/8" a "beautiful love anthem sounds like a strong R&B hit to our ears with its climatic violins, fluttering flutes and live drums." He compared the song to other Motown era compositions but "was remixed for our modern times." The New York Times found that the unhappiness on "25/8" still "motivates her best work," declared it a "fragile, baleful, speechy [...] upbeat, hip-hop/gospel" track. Caryn Ganz of Rolling Stone rated the song three stars out of five, writing that "it's goopy stuff, but it's also far more neck-poppin' fun than Beyoncé's '1+1'." In his review of My Life II, Consequence of Sound editor Siobhán Kane found that while songs like “25/8” "don’t work as well (in the context of her classic record My Life) [...] they do showcase her powerful vocal, which is searing."

Music video
Blige filmed the video for 25/8 in late September 2011. The director of the video is Diane Martel. The video premiered on October 28, 2011.

Formats and track listings

Credits and personnel
Credits adapted from the liner notes of My Life II... The Journey Continues (Act 1).

Production – Eric Hudson, Mary J. Blige
Additional instruments – Ron Fair
Recording – Danny Cheung
 Recording assistance - Jon Nettlesby

Mixing – Jaycen Joshua
Mixing assistance - Jesus Garnica
Additional Mixing  - Peter Mokran, Kendu Isaacs
Mastering - Dave Kutch

Charts

Weekly charts

Release history

References

External links
 Official website

2011 singles
Mary J. Blige songs
Music videos directed by Diane Martel
Songs written by Crystal Nicole
2011 songs
Geffen Records singles
Songs written by Eric Hudson
Songs written by Mary J. Blige
Songs written by Al Sherrod Lambert
Song recordings produced by Eric Hudson